Kęszyca Leśna  is a village in the administrative district of Gmina Międzyrzecz, within Międzyrzecz County, Lubusz Voivodeship, in western Poland. It was a location of the Soviet military garrison, which left in 1993, and since 1994 it is an independent populated place.

See also
Regenwurmlager

References

Villages in Międzyrzecz County